Wide Prairie is a posthumous compilation album by Linda McCartney, compiled by her husband Paul McCartney and released in October 1998, roughly six months after her death due to breast cancer. The idea for the album was inspired by a fan who wrote Paul McCartney inquiring about "Seaside Woman", a song Wings released under the name Suzy and the Red Stripes featuring Linda on lead vocals.

Promotion and reception
To promote the album Paul McCartney held an 80 minutes webcast on 17 December 1998. During the show McCartney answered questions submitted by the fans about Linda and the recording of the album, played promo videos and cooked mashed potatoes.
The album reached #127 in the UK charts with two singles released in support. The title track made the top 75, at #74, while "The Light Comes from Within" charted at #56.

Track listing

Personnel
 Linda McCartney – lead, backing and harmony vocals, piano, electric piano, keyboards, mellotron, synthesizer
 Paul McCartney – backing and harmony vocals, speaking voice, bass, double bass, electric and acoustic guitars, banjo, piano, electric piano, clavinet, electronic organ, organ, mellotron, synthesizer, string synthesizer, drums, drum machine, congas, engineer, cover design
 James McCartney – electric and acoustic guitar (on "The Light Comes from Within")
 Denny Laine – electric and acoustic guitars, backing vocals (on "I Got Up"), piano (on "Seaside Woman"), flute (on "Oriental Nightfish")
 Jimmy McCulloch – electric guitar (on "Wild Prairie" and "I Got Up")
 Henry McCullough – electric guitar (on "Seaside Woman")
 Laurence Juber – acoustic guitar (on "Love's Full Glory")
 Robbie McIntosh – electric guitar (on "The White Coated Man")
 Billy Boy – electric guitar (on "Mister Sandman")
 Lloyd Green – pedal steel guitar (on "Love's Full Glory")
 Boris Gardiner – bass guitar (on "Mister Sandman" and "Sugartime")
 Joe English – drums (on "New Orleans" and "Cook of the House")
 Denny Seiwell – drums (on "Seaside Woman")
 Mike "Boo" Richards – drums (on "Mister Sandman" and "Sugartime")
 Davey Lutton – drums (on "Wild Prairie" and "I Got Up")
 Ian Maidman  – bass, drums, engineer and producer (on "Endless Days" and "Poison Ivy"), electric guitar and backing vocals (on "Poison Ivy")
 Geoffrey Richardson – mandolin, slide guitar (on "Endless Days")
 Mick Bolton – piano, keyboards, backing vocals (on "Endless Days" and "Poison Ivy")
 Steve Johnson – string synthesizer, synth bass, trumpet (on "The White Coated Man")
 Winston Wright – keyboards (on "Mister Sandman")
 Vassar Clements and Johnny Gimble - fiddles (on "Wild Prairie")
 Thaddeus Richard – alto saxophone (on "Wild Prairie")
 William Puett – tenor saxophone (on "Wild Prairie")
 Norman Ray – baritone saxophone (on "Wild Prairie")
 Hewlett Quillen – trombone (on "Wild Prairie")
 George Tidwell and Barry McDonald – trumpets (on "Wild Prairie")
 Steve Fletcher – backing vocals (on "Poison Ivy")
 Carla Lane – spoken verse (on "The White Coated Man" and "Cow")
 Lee Perry – producer (on "Mister Sandman" and "Sugartime")

References

External links
 Wide Prairie at Macca-central.com 

Linda McCartney albums
Compilation albums published posthumously
Parlophone albums
Albums produced by Linda McCartney
Albums produced by Paul McCartney
1998 compilation albums
Capitol Records albums